The Racer is a 2020 sports drama film. The film stars Louis Talpe, Matteo Simoni, Tara Lee, Iain Glen and Karel Roden.

Cast
 Louis Talpe as Dominique "Dom" Chabol
 Matteo Simoni as Lupo "Tartare" Marino
 Tara Lee as Dr. Lynn Brennan
 Iain Glen as Sonny McElhone
 Karel Roden as Viking
 Timo Wagner as Stefano Drago
 Diogo Cid as Enzo
 Ward Kerremans as Lionel Dardonne
 Paul Robert as Erik Schultz

Production
In 2018, a film centering around the 1998 Tour de France, titled The Domestique and to be directed by Kieron J. Walsh and written by Ciarán Cassidy, was announced. Production was taken over by Blinder Films, with the movie receiving €800,000 funding through Screen Ireland, the Irish state development agency. The film has since been renamed The Racer and secured funding from Screen Flanders, the Film Fund Luxembourg, Eurimages, the BAI Sound & Vision Fund, and RTÉ.

Release
It premiered at the 2020 South by Southwest.

Reception

References

External links
 

2020s sports drama films
2020s English-language films
2020s French-language films
2020s Italian-language films
2020s Dutch-language films
2020s Spanish-language films
2020s Portuguese-language films
Irish sports drama films
Luxembourgian drama films
Luxembourgian sports films
Belgian sports drama films
Cycling films
Films about doping
Films set in 1998
Films set in Dublin (city)
Films set in Ireland
Films shot in the Republic of Ireland
Films shot in Dublin (city)
Films shot in Luxembourg
1998 Tour de France
Doping at the Tour de France
Tour de France mass media
2020 multilingual films
Belgian multilingual films
English-language Belgian films
English-language Luxembourgian films